The 2000 Giro di Lombardia was the 94th edition of the Giro di Lombardia cycle race and was held on 21 October 2000. The race started in Varese and finished in Bergamo. The race was won by Raimondas Rumšas of the Fassa Bortolo team.

General classification

References

2000
Giro di Lombardia
Giro di Lombardia
Giro Di Lombardia
October 2000 sports events in Europe